The Podilskyi District is an urban district of Kyiv, the capital of Ukraine. Its population was 177,563 at the 2001 census. The district takes its name from the historic Podil neighborhood which it includes within its boundaries.

The Podilskyi District as an administrative entity was formed in 1921 on one of the largest historical neighborhoods in Kyiv. In May 2001 the Podilskyi District celebrated the 80th anniversary of its foundation. The district remains one of the main business, transport, and industrial areas of Kyiv.

There are currently 50 large industrial organizations based here. Although most of the industrial sites are phased out of the region, they dominate the adjacent neighborhoods to the north, named today "Podilsko-Kurenivskiy promraion".

Neighborhoods
The Podilskyi District includes the following historical neighborhoods of Kyiv within its boundaries:
 Podil 
 Vynohradar
 Kurenivka 
 Petrivka (Pochayna)
 Nyvky
 Rybalskyi Peninsula
 Mostytskyi

Transport
The Podilskyi District is connected to the city's metro system by three stations on the Obolonsko–Teremkivska Line: Tarasa Shevchenka, Kontraktova Ploshcha (named after Kontraktova Square), and Poshtova Ploshcha (named after Poshtova Square).

Tourist attractions
 Ukrainian National Chernobyl Museum - museum dedicated to the Chernobyl disaster
 National Museum of the History of Ukraine - museum dedicated to the History of Ukraine

Universities
 National University of Kyiv-Mohyla Academy

References

External links
 
 

 
Urban districts of Kyiv